Four is the fourth extended play by Welsh recording artist Charlotte Church. It is the last in a series of four EPs released by Church. Her fourth alternative rock material, it was released on 10 March 2014 and preceded by the lead single "Little Movements".

Track listing

References

2013 EPs
Charlotte Church albums